Wen Minsheng (1915–1997) was CPC Committee Secretary and Governor of Henan. Born in Shanxi.

1915 births
1997 deaths
People's Republic of China politicians from Shanxi
Chinese Communist Party politicians from Shanxi
Governors of Henan
Mayors of Harbin
Members of the Central Advisory Commission
Delegates to the 2nd National People's Congress
Delegates to the 3rd National People's Congress
Vice-governors of Guangdong
Politicians from Yuncheng